Velan is a 2021 Indian Tamil-language action drama film written and directed by debutant Kavin and produced by Skyman Films International. The film stars Mugen Rao, Soori and Meenakshi Govindarajan with a supporting cast including Prabhu, Thambi Ramaiah and Hareesh Peradi. The music is composed by Gopi Sundar. The film was released in theatres on 31 December 2021.

Synopsis 
The plot revolves around Velan (Mugen Rao), who gets into the bad books of his father Palanisamy (Prabhu), a big shot in his village, due to his privileged behavior. He falls in love with his college friend Ananya (Meenakshi Govindarajan), a Malayali. A mix-up causes her father to fix Velan's match with Vidusha (Maria Vincent), who is also a Malayali girl from her college. When Vidusha's lover Velan and Dineshan (Soori) clear up this confusion without hurting her father, especially when the girl's father Ananda Kuttan (Thambi Ramaiah) and Veluchamy (Hareesh Peradi), who resents the Velan family, plot to embarrass Palanisamy.

Cast

 Mugen Rao as Velan
 Soori as 'Mamookka' Dineshan
 Meenakshi Govindarajan as Ananya
 Prabhu as 'Thillaiyar' Palanisamy
 Sriranjini as Amrutham
 Hareesh Peradi as RKV Veluchamy
 Thambi Ramaiah as Ananda Kuttan
 T. M. Karthik as Madhivanan
 Joe Malloori as Thillaiyar
 Maria Vincent as Vidhusha
 'Prankster' Rahul as Sathish
 Brigida Saga as Pavithra
 Billy Murali as Kaliyamoorthy
 Swaminathan as Priest

Soundtrack 
The soundtrack and score is composed by Gopi Sundar, and the album featured four songs. The audio rights were acquired by Think Music.

Release

Theatrical 
The film was released in theatres on 31 December 2021 and opened to moderate reviews from critics.

Home Media 
The post-theatrical streaming rights of the film was bought by ZEE5 and the satellite rights of the film was bought by Zee Tamil and Zee Thirai.

Reception 
Suganth of The Times of India rated the film with 2.5/5 stars, stating that "Velan exists somewhere in between these two experiences. It is not a film one can whole-heartedly recommend, but at the same time, it is not exactly bad. Is it glass-half-full or glass-half-empty for you?" Sify gave a rating of 3 out on 5 and wrote, "Velan is not a groundbreaking attempt in Tamil cinema but it's not a film that is difficult to sit through. It's a typical rural entertainer with a predictable screenplay but the comedy and emotions work!" Bhuvanesh Chandar of Cinema Express wrote, "In commercial family entertainers like Velan, at least one of the many elements cooked together should work to pull in the audience. Sadly, except for the interval block, none of the scenes works in its favour. To all poorly cooked commercial entertainers, Velan screams "Sema Killi!""

References

External links 
 

2021 action films
2021 directorial debut films